Wheeler Peak may refer to the following United States summits:

Wheeler BM, a benchmark Nevada summit north-northwest of Wheeler Pass: 
Wheeler Peak (Alaska)
Wheeler Peak, California, in the Sweetwater Mountains
Wheeler Peak (Mono County, California), on the Wheeler Crest:  
Wheeler Peak (Plumas County, California)
Wheeler Peak (Tuolumne County, California)
Wheeler Peak (Nevada) - highest summit of the Snake Range
Wheeler Peak (New Mexico) - highest summit of the Taos Mountains and in the State of New Mexico
Wheeler Ridge, a Kern County peak west of the town of Wheeler Ridge, California

Others
Mount Wheeler, 365 m peak in Queensland, Australia

References